Hemalatha (19262019) was an Indian actress of Telugu cinema, of Andhra Pradesh, India. She acted in more than 100 films during the 1950s to 1976. The first movie she acted was Palletooru. She retired from movies in 1976, with Seethamma Santhanam being the film she last appeared. After retiring from movies, she was involved in Brahma Kumaris movement in Hyderabad till her death.

Selected filmography

Actress

 1976 Seethamma Santanam
 1976 Mahakavi Kshetrayya
 1976 Sita Kalyanam
 1976 Secretary
 1976 Vemulawada Bheemakavi
 1975 Balipeetam
 1975 Eduruleni Manishi
 1975 Kathanayakuni Katha
 1975 Sri Ramanjaneya Yuddham
 1973 Vaade Veedu
 1972 Bharya Biddalu
 1972 Sri Krishnanjaneya Yuddham
 1971 Prema Nagar
 1971 Sampoorna Ramayanam
 1971 Jeevitha Chakram
 1970 Marina Manishi
 1970 Mayani Mamata
 1970 Pettandarulu
 1970 Ali Baba 40 Dongalu
 1970 Lakshmi Kataksham
 1970 Balaraju Katha
 1969 Karpura Harathi
 1969 Mathru Devata
 1969 Kadaladu Vadaladu
 1969 Aadarsa Kutumbam
 1969 Gandikota Rahasyam
 1968 Deva kanya
 1968 Bangaru Gaajulu
 1968 Manchi Kutumbam
 1968 Nindu Samsaram
 1968 Niluvu Dopidi
 1968 Tikka Sankaraiah
 1967 Sri Krishnavataram
 1967 Gopaludu Bhoopaludu
 1967 Ummadi Kutumbam
 1966 Mangalasutram
 1966 Palnati Yuddham
 1966 Navarathri
 1966 Aatma Gowravam
 1965 Zamindar
 1965 C. I. D.
 1965 Visala Hrudayalu
 1965 Manchi Kutumbam
 1965 Devatha
 1965 Manushulu Mamathalu
 1965 Enga Veetu Pillai Tamil movie
 1964 Pooja Phalam
 1964 Aathma Balam
 1964 Kalavari Kodalu
 1964 Vivaha Bandham 
 1964 Ramudu Bheemudu
 1964 Vaarasatwam
 1964 Manchi Manishi
 1964 Sri Tirupatamma Katha
 1963 Savati Koduku
 1963 Chaduvukunna Ammayilu
 1963 Eedu Jodu
 1963 Punarjanma
 1962 Padandi Munduku
 1962 Gundamma Katha
 1962 Tiger Ramudu
 1962 Gulebakavali Katha
 1961 Bharya Bharthalu
 1961 Kalasivunte Kaladu Sukham
 1961 Pendli Pilupu
 1961 Velugu Needalu
 1960 Nammina Bantu
 1960 Devanthakudu
 1960 Santhi Nivasam
 1959 Pelli Sandadi
 1959 Illarikam
 1959 Banda Ramudu
 1959 Bala Nagamma
 1958 Raja Nandini
 1958 Atha Okinti Kodale
 1958 Ettuku Pai Ettu
 1958 Shobha
 1958 Bhookailasa
 1958 Bhookailas
 1957 Bhale Ammayilu
 1957 Bhagya Rekha
 1956 Sonta Ooru
 1956 Penki Pellam
 1956 Charana Daasi
 1956 Edi Nijam
 1956 Bhale Ramudu
 1955 Donga Ramudu
 1955 Kanyasulkam
 1955 Santhanam
 1955 Rojulu Marayi
 1954 Bangaru Papa
 1954 Anta Manavalle
 1954 Vaddante Dabbu
 1954 Peddamanushulu
 1954 Todu Dongalu
 1954 Sangham
 1953 Chandirani
 1952 Palletooru – Debut

References

External links
 

Indian film actresses
Actresses from Andhra Pradesh
Actresses in Telugu cinema
Indian stage actresses
Actresses in Telugu theatre
1926 births
2019 deaths